Kostrzewa may refer to:
 Kostrzewa, Choszczno County, village in West Pomeranian Voivodeship, Poland
 Kostrzewa, Koszalin County, settlement in West Pomeranian Voivodeship, Poland
 Kostrzewa (surname)

See also